Feminine Cycling Team (UCI code FCT) is a professional women's cycling team, based in Germany, which is scheduled to compete in elite road bicycle racing events such as the UCI Women's Road World Cup in 2015.

Team history

2014

Riders in
On December 1, 2014, the team signed Sophie Lacher, Corine Van der Zijden, Annabell Oschger, Jacqueline Dietrich, Desiree Eherler and Jacqueline Hahn (Bigla Cycling Team). On December 2, the team signed Lotte Van Hoek. The following day the team signed Stéphanie Borchers and Carolin Happke.

Major wins
2015
Montreux Criterium, Desiree Eherler

References

UCI Women's Teams
Cycling teams established in 2015
Cycling teams based in Germany
2015 establishments in Germany